The Abergele cattle are the smallest breed of cattle in north Ethiopia. They are reared in the Abergele lowlands and at the southwestern lower slopes of Dogu'a Tembien district. Abergele cattle are part of the Zenga breed group. The Abergele breed is known for its adaptation to the hotter and drier lowlands. It is also very tolerant to diseases and parasites and can cope with feed shortages during long dry periods.

Physical characteristics 
The Abergele cattle generally have red coat colours. Bulls and oxen have thick and short horns and a cervicothoracic hump; cows have medium, thin horns. Oxen weigh 234kg and cows 153 kg on average. The average height at withers of 109 and 97 cm.

Closely related types
 Arado cattle

Origin of the cattle breed 
Ethiopia has been at a crossroads for cattle immigration to Africa due to
 proximity to the geographical entry of Indian and Arabian zebu
 proximity to Near-Eastern and European taurine
 introgression with West African taurine due to pastoralism
Furthermore, the diverse agro-ecology led to diverse farming systems which, in turn, made Ethiopia a centre of secondary diversification for livestock : 
 The Sanga cattle originated in Ethiopia. They are a major bovine group in Africa – a cross-breeding of local long-horned taurines and Arabian zebus
 The Zenga (Zebu-Sanga) breeds (including the Abergele), which resulted from a second introduction and crossing with Indian zebu

Stresses on the cattle breed 
 socio-political: urbanisation, and civil wars
 panzootic: cattle plague
 environmental: destruction of ecosystems and droughts
 modernisation stresses: extensive cross-breeding

References 

Cattle breeds
Cattle breeds originating in Ethiopia
Tigray Region